An active suspension is a type of automotive suspension on a vehicle. It uses an onboard system to control the vertical movement of the vehicle's wheels relative to the chassis or vehicle body rather than the passive suspension provided by large springs where the movement is determined entirely by the road surface. Active suspensions are divided into two classes: real active suspensions, and adaptive or semi-active suspensions. While semi-adaptive suspensions only vary shock absorber firmness to match changing road or dynamic conditions, active suspensions use some type of actuator to raise and lower the chassis independently at each wheel.

These technologies allow car manufacturers to achieve a greater degree of ride quality and car handling by keeping the tires perpendicular to the road in corners, allowing better traction and control. An onboard computer detects body movement from sensors throughout the vehicle and, using that data, controls the action of the active and semi-active suspensions. The system virtually eliminates body roll and pitch variation in many driving situations including cornering, accelerating, and braking.

Principle 

Skyhook theory is that the ideal suspension would let the vehicle maintain a stable posture as if suspended by an imaginary hook in the sky, unaffected by road conditions. 

Since an actual skyhook is obviously impractical, real active suspension systems are based on actuator operations. The imaginary line (of zero vertical acceleration) is calculated based on the value provided by an acceleration sensor installed on the body of the vehicle (see Figure 3). The dynamic elements comprise only the linear spring and the linear damper; therefore, no complicated calculations are necessary.

A vehicle contacts the ground through the spring and damper in a normal spring damper suspension, as in Figure 1. To achieve the same level of stability as the Skyhook theory, the vehicle must contact the ground through the spring, and the imaginary line with the damper, as in Figure 2.
Theoretically, in a case where the damping coefficient reaches an infinite value, the vehicle will be in a state where it is completely fixed to the imaginary line, thus the vehicle will not shake.

Active 
Active suspensions, the first to be introduced, use separate actuators which can exert an independent force on the suspension to improve the riding characteristics. The drawbacks of this design are high cost, added complication and mass of the apparatus, and the need for frequent maintenance on some implementations. Maintenance can require specialised tools, and some problems can be difficult to diagnose.

Hydraulic actuation 
Hydraulically actuated suspensions are controlled with the use of hydraulics. The first example appeared in 1954, with the hydropneumatic suspension developed by Paul Magès at Citroën. The hydraulic pressure is supplied by a high pressure radial piston hydraulic pump. Sensors continually monitor body movement and vehicle ride level, constantly supplying the hydraulic height correctors with new data. In a matter of a few milliseconds, the suspension generates counter forces to raise or lower the body. During driving maneuvers, the encased nitrogen compresses instantly, offering six times the compressibility of the steel springs used by vehicles up to this time.

In practice, the system has always incorporated the desirable self-levelling suspension and height adjustable suspension features, with the latter now tied to vehicle speed for improved aerodynamic performance, as the vehicle lowers itself at high speed.

This system performed remarkably well in straight ahead driving, including over uneven surfaces, but had little control over roll stiffness.

Millions of production vehicles have been built with variations on this system.

Electronic actuation of hydraulic suspension
Colin Chapman developed the original concept of computer management of hydraulic suspension in the 1980s to improve cornering in racing cars. Lotus fitted and developed a prototype system to a 1985 Excel with electro-hydraulic active suspension, but never offered it for sale to the public, although many demonstration cars were built for other manufacturers.

Sensors continually monitor body movement and vehicle ride level, constantly supplying the computer with new data. As the computer receives and processes data, it operates the hydraulic servos, mounted beside each wheel. Almost instantly, the servo-regulated suspension generates counter forces to body lean, dive, and squat during driving maneuvers.

Williams Grand Prix Engineering prepared an active suspension, devised by designer-aerodynamicist Frank Dernie, for the team's Formula 1 cars in 1992, creating such successful cars that the Fédération Internationale de l'Automobile decided to ban the technology to decrease the gap between Williams F1 team and its competitors. 

Computer Active Technology Suspension (CATS) co-ordinates the best possible balance between ride quality and handling by analysing road conditions and making up to 3,000 adjustments every second to the suspension settings via electronically controlled dampers.

The 1999 Mercedes-Benz CL-Class (C215) introduced Active Body Control, where high pressure hydraulic servos are controlled by electronic computing, and this feature is still available. Vehicles can be designed to actively lean into curves to improve occupant comfort.

Active anti-roll bar 
Active anti-roll bar stiffens under command of the driver or suspension electronic control unit (ECU) during hard cornering. First production car was Mitsubishi Mirage Cyborg in 1988.

Electromagnetic recuperative 

In fully active electronically controlled production cars, the application of electric servos and motors married to electronic computing allows for flat cornering and instant reactions to road conditions. 

The Bose Corporation has a proof of concept model. The founder of Bose, Amar Bose, had been working on exotic suspensions for many years while he was an MIT professor.

Electromagnetic active suspension uses linear electromagnetic motors attached to each wheel. It provides extremely fast response, and allows regeneration of power consumed, by using the motors as generators. This nearly surmounts the issues of slow response times and high power consumption of hydraulic systems. Electronically controlled active suspension system (ECASS) technology was patented by the University of Texas Center for Electromechanics in the 1990s and has been developed by L-3 Electronic Systems for use on military vehicles. The ECASS-equipped Humvee exceeded the performance specifications for all performance evaluations in terms of absorbed power to the vehicle operator, stability and handling.

Active Wheel
Michelin's Active Wheel from 2004 incorporates an in-wheel electrical suspension motor that controls torque distribution, traction, turning maneuvers, pitch, roll and suspension damping for that wheel, in addition to an in-wheel electric traction motor.

Audi active electromechanical suspension system introduced in 2017. It drives each wheel individually and adapts to the prevailing road conditions. Each wheel has an electric motor which is powered by the 48-volt main electrical system. Additional components include gears, a rotary tube together with internal titanium torsion bar and a lever which exerts up to 1,100 Nm (811.3 lb-ft) on the suspension via a coupling rod. Thanks to the front camera, the sedan detects bumps in the road early on and predictively adjusts the active suspension. Even before the car reaches a bump in the road, the preview function developed by Audi transmits the right amount of travel to the actuators and actively controls the suspension. The computer-controlled motors can sense imperfection on the road, and can raise the suspension up from the wheel which would go over the undulation, thus aiding the ride quality. The system will direct the motors on the outside to push up or pull down the suspension while cornering. This will result in a flatter drive and reduced body-roll around corners which in turn means more confident handling dynamics.

Adaptive and semi-active 

Adaptive or semi-active systems can only change the viscous damping coefficient of the shock absorber, and do not add energy to the suspension system. While adaptative suspensions have generally a slow time response and a limited number of damping coefficient values, semi-active suspensions have time response close to a few milliseconds and can provide a wide range of damping values. Therefore, adaptative suspensions usually only propose different riding modes (comfort, normal, sport...) corresponding to different damping coefficients, while semi-active suspensions modify the damping in real time, depending on the road conditions and the dynamics of the car. Though limited in their intervention (for example, the control force can never have different direction than the current vector of velocity of the suspension), semi-active suspensions are less expensive to design and consume far less energy. In recent times, research in semi-active suspensions has continued to advance with respect to their capabilities, narrowing the gap between semi-active and fully active suspension systems.

Solenoid/valve actuated 
This type is the most economic and basic type of semi-active suspensions. They consist of a solenoid valve which alters the flow of the hydraulic medium inside the shock absorber, therefore changing the damping characteristics of the suspension setup. The solenoids are wired to the controlling computer, which sends them commands depending on the control algorithm (usually the so-called "Sky-Hook" technique). This type of system is used in Cadillac's Computer Command Ride (CCR) suspension system. The first production car was the Toyota Soarer with semi-active Toyota Electronic Modulated Suspension, from 1983.

Magnetorheological damper 

Another fairly recent method incorporates magnetorheological dampers with a brand name MagneRide. It was initially developed by Delphi Corporation for GM and was standard, as many other new technologies, for Cadillac STS (from model 2002), and on some other GM models from 2003. This was an upgrade for semi-active systems ("automatic road-sensing suspensions") used in upscale GM vehicles for decades. It allows, together with faster modern computers, changing the stiffness of all wheel suspensions independently. These dampers are finding increased usage in the US and already leases to some foreign brands, mostly in more expensive vehicles.

This system was in development for 25 years. The damper fluid contains metallic particles.  Through the onboard computer, the dampers' compliance characteristics are controlled by an electromagnet. Essentially, increasing the current flow into the damper magnetic circuit increases the circuit magnetic flux. This in turn causes the metal particles to change their alignment, which increases fluid viscosity thereby raising the compression/rebound rates, while a decrease softens the effect of the dampers by aligning the particles in the opposite direction. If we imagine the metal particles as dinner plates then whilst aligned so they are on edge -  viscosity is minimised. At the other end of the spectrum they will be aligned at 90 degrees so flat. Thus making the fluid much more viscous. It is the electric field produced by the electromagnet that changes the alignment of the metal particles.  Information from wheel sensors (about suspension extension), steering, acceleration sensors - and other data, is used to calculate the optimal stiffness at that point in time. The fast reaction of the system (milliseconds) allows, for instance, making a softer passing by a single wheel over a bump in the road at a particular instant in time.

Production vehicles 

By calendar year:

 1954: Citroën Traction Avant 15-6H:, self-leveling Citroën hydropneumatic suspension on rear wheels.
 1955: Citroën DS, self-leveling Citroën hydropneumatic suspension on all four wheels.
 1957: Cadillac Eldorado Brougham: premiere of self-leveling GM air suspension
1967: Rolls-Royce Silver Shadow Partial load bearing hydropneumatic suspension on all four wheels. Front system deleted in 1969
 1970: Citroën SM, self-leveling Citroën hydropneumatic suspension on all four wheels.
 1970: Citroën GS, self-leveling Citroën hydropneumatic suspension on all four wheels.
 1974: Citroën CX, self-leveling Citroën hydropneumatic suspension on all four wheels.
1975: Mercedes Benz 450 SEL 6.9 Hydropneumatic suspension on all four wheels.
 1982: Citroën BX, self-leveling Citroën hydropneumatic suspension on all four wheels.
 1979: Mercedes Benz W126 Hydropneumatic suspension on all four wheels as an option on the LWB v8 models
 1983: Toyota Soarer: premiere of semi-active Toyota Electronic Modulated Suspension (TEMS)
1985 Mercedes Benz 190E 2.3-16 Partial load bearing hydropneumatic suspension on all four wheels as an option on the 16v model. Standard on the Evo 1 and Evo 2 models
1986: Jaguar XJ40, self-leveling suspension.
 1986: Toyota Soarer: world first Electronically controlled (TEMS) full air suspension (spring constant, variable attenuation force) installed
1986: Mercedes Benz W126 Hydropneumatic suspension on all four wheels with electronically controlled adaptive damping as an option on the LWB v8 models
 1987: Mitsubishi Galant (sixth generation) - features Active Controlled Suspension (Dynamic ECS). The system enables a comfortable ride and handling stability by automatically adjusting the vehicle height and damping force.
 1989: Citroën XM - self-levelling, semi-active Hydractive on all four wheels with automatically adjusted spring rates and dampeners.
1989: Mercedes Benz R129 Partial load bearing hydropneumatic suspension with automatically adjusted spring rates and dampers as an option (ADS)
 1990: *First semi-active suspension scanning the road ahead (sonar) - 1990 Nissan Leopard/Nissan Cedric/Nissan Maxima/Nissan J30 DUET-SS Super Sonic Suspension
 1990: Infiniti Q45 "Full-Active Suspension (FAS)", active suspension system, although it did still have conventional coil springs
 1992: Toyota Celica (Toyota Electronically Modulated Suspension)
 1992: Citroën Xantia VSX - self-levelling, semi-active Hydractive 2 on all four wheels, with automatically adjusted spring rates and dampeners.
 1993: Cadillac, several models with RSS road sensing suspension. RSS was available in both standard and CVRSS (continuously variable road sensing suspension) systems. It monitored damping rates of the shock absorbers every 15 milliseconds, selecting between two settings.
1994: Toyota Celsior introduced first Skyhook air suspension
 1994: Citroën Xantia Activa - self-levelling, fully active Hydractive on all four wheels with hydraulic anti-roll bars and automatically adjusted spring rates and dampeners.
 1998: Land Rover Discovery series 2 - Active Cornering Enhancement; an electronically controlled hydraulic anti-roll bar system was fitted to some versions, which reduced cornering roll.
1999: Mercedes Benz C215 Self leveling fully active hydraulic Active body control. Available on the S, CL and SL models
2002: Cadillac Seville STS, first MagneRide
 2004: Volvo S60 R and V70 R (Four-C, a short name for "Continuously Controlled Chassis Concept", semi-active)
 2010: Alfa Romeo MiTo Cloverleaf (DNA System based on Maserati's Skyhook technology)
 2012: Jaguar XF Sportbrake, self-leveling air suspension.
2013: Mercedes Benz W222: Optional Magic body control. Self leveling fully active hydraulic system with road surface scanning electronics
2013: Volkswagen Mk7 Golf R User-Selectable Electronically Controlled Shock Dampening (Dynamic Chassis Control (DCC)) 
 2019: Toyota Avalon Touring model (Adaptive Variable Suspension (AVS))

See also 
 Toyota Active Control Suspension
Hydropneumatic suspension
Active Body control

References 

 
 

Advanced driver assistance systems
Automotive suspension technologies
Mechanical power control